Aequornithes (from Latin aequor, expanse of water + Greek ornithes, birds), or core water birds, are defined as "the least inclusive clade containing Gaviidae and Phalacrocoracidae".

The monophyly of the group is currently supported by several molecular phylogenetic studies.

Aequornithes includes the clades Gaviiformes, Sphenisciformes, Procellariiformes, Ciconiiformes, Suliformes and Pelecaniformes. It does not include several unrelated groups of aquatic birds such as flamingos and grebes (Mirandornithes), shorebirds and auks (Charadriiformes), or the Anseriformes.

Based on a whole-genome analysis of the bird orders, the kagu and sunbittern (Eurypygiformes) and the three species of tropicbirds (Phaethontiformes) together styled as the Eurypygimorphae are the closest sister group of the Aequornithes, in a clade later named Phaethoquornithes. 

Cladogram  based on Burleigh, J.G. et al. (2015) with some names after Sangster, G. & Mayr, G. (2021).

References

Birds by classification
Taxa named by Gerald Mayr
Extant Maastrichtian first appearances